The following is a list of television series produced in Poland:

Adventure

The Alaska Kid
Dwa światy
Gazda z Diabelnej
Gruby
Janosik
Oko proroka czyli Hanusz Bystry i jego przygody
Plecak pełen przygód
Przygody pana Michała
Przyłbice i kaptury
Rycerze i rabusie
Samochodzik i templariusze
The Secret of Sagal
Siedem życzeń
Tajna misja
Trzy szalone zera
W krainie Władcy Smoków
Wakacje z duchami
WOW

Animated

1000 złych uczynków
Agi Bagi
Andzia
Bajka o trzech smokach
Bajki Bolka i Lolka
Bajki Pana Bałagana
Bajki zza okna
Bajki świata
Bardzo przygodowe podróże Kulfona
Baśnie i bajki polskie
Baśnie i waśnie
Bolek and Lolek
Bolek i Lolek na Dzikim Zachodzie (animated series)
Bolek i Lolek na wakacjach
Bolek i Lolek wyruszają w świat
Bukolandia
Bąblandia
Celebrechty
Cywilizacja (animated series)
Czternaście bajek z Królestwa Lailonii Leszka Kołakowskiego
Dixie (animated series)
Dwa koty i pies
Dziwne przygody Koziołka Matołka
Ferdynand Wspaniały (animated series)
Kot Filemon
Film pod strasznym tytułem
Fortele Jonatana Koota
Generał Italia
Gucio i Cezar
Harry i Toto
Hip-Hip i Hurra
Jacek Śpioszek
Jeż Kleofas
Kangurek Hip-Hop
Kapitan Bomba
Karrypel kontra Groszki
Kasztaniaki
Kochajmy straszydła
Kolorowy świat Pacyka
Król Maciuś Pierwszy (animated series)
Kulfon, co z ciebie wyrośnie?
Leśne skrzaty i kaczorek Feluś
Lis Leon
Marceli Szpak dziwi się światu
Maurycy i Hawranek
Mały Pingwin Pik-Pok (animated series)
Mieszkaniec zegara z kurantem
Między nami bocianami
Miś Fantazy
Miś Kudłatek
Miś Uszatek
Mordziaki
Na tropie
Nasz dziadzio
Niezły kanał
O dwóch takich, co ukradli księżyc (animated series)
Olimpiada Bolka i Lolka
Opowiadania Muminków
Pampalini łowca zwierząt
Parapet (animated series)
Pies, kot i...
Piesek Dali
Piesek w kratkę
Plastelinki
Plastusiowy pamiętnik (animated series)
Pod gradobiciem pytań
Podróże do bajek
Podróże kapitana Klipera
Pomysłowy Dobromir
Pomysłowy wnuczek
Porwanie Baltazara Gąbki
Powrót do Wiklinowej Zatoki
Proszę słonia
Przygody Błękitnego Rycerzyka
Przygody Gapiszona
Przygody Misia Colargola
Przygody Myszki
Przygody skrzatów
Przygód kilka wróbla Ćwirka
Przypadki Zwierzo-Jeża
Przytulaki
Pucuł i Grzechu
Reggae Rabbits
Reksio
Różne przygody Gąski Balbinki
Tajemnica szyfru Marabuta
Tajemnice wiklinowej zatoki
Troo (animated series)
Trzy misie (animated series)
Tydzień przygód w Afryce
W krainie czarnoksiężnika Oza (animated series)
Wielka podróż Bolka i Lolka
Wyprawa Profesora Gąbki
Wędrówki Pyzy
Włatcy móch
Zaczarowany ołówek
Zima w Wiklinowej Zatoce
Zwierzaki-cudaki

Biographical

Generał (television series)
Hrabina Cosel (television series)
Kanclerz (television series)
Kopernik (television series)
Królewskie sny
Królowa Bona
Marszałek Piłsudski
Modrzejewska
Polska Jasienicy
Wielka miłość Balzaka
Święty Augustyn (miniserial)

Children's

Agi Bagi
Awantura o Basię (television series)
Bajka o bajkach
Bajka o trzech smokach
Bajki Bolka i Lolka
Bajki Pana Bałagana
Bajki zza okna
Banda Rudego Pająka
Bardzo przygodowe podróże Kulfona
Baśnie i bajki polskie
Baśnie i waśnie
Bolek i Lolek (animated series)
Bolek i Lolek na Dzikim Zachodzie (animated series)
Bolek i Lolek na wakacjach
Bolek i Lolek wyruszają w świat
Czternaście bajek z Królestwa Lailonii Leszka Kołakowskiego
Dixie (animated series)
Do dzwonka
Do przerwy 0:1 (television series)
Dom na głowie
Dwa koty i pies
Dwa światy (television series)
Dziwne przygody Koziołka Matołka
Ferdynand Wspaniały (animated series)
Kot Filemon
Film pod strasznym tytułem
Fortele Jonatana Koota
Gniewko, syn rybaka
Gruby
Gucio i Cezar
Gwiezdny Pirat (television series)
Hip-Hip i Hurra
Jacek i Agatka
Janka (television series)
Kamienna tajemnica
Kangurek Hip-Hop
Klasa na obcasach
Klementynka i Klemens - gęsi z Doliny Młynów
Kochajmy straszydła
Król Maciuś Pierwszy (animated series)
Kulfon, co z ciebie wyrośnie?
Leśne skrzaty i kaczorek Feluś
Lis Leon
Magiczne drzewo
Marceli Szpak dziwi się światu
Maszyna zmian
Maszyna zmian. Nowe przygody
Maurycy i Hawranek
Mały Pingwin Pik-Pok (animated series)
Mieszkaniec zegara z kurantem
Miś Fantazy
Miś Kudłatek
Miś Uszatek
Molly
Na tropie
Nasz dziadzio
Niewiarygodne przygody Marka Piegusa (television series)
O dwóch takich, co ukradli księżyc (animated series)
Oko proroka czyli Hanusz Bystry i jego przygody (television series)
Olimpiada Bolka i Lolka
Opowiadania Muminków
Pampalini łowca zwierząt
Pierścień i róża (television series)
Pies, kot i...
Piesek Dali
Piesek w kratkę
Plastelinki
Plastusiowy pamiętnik (animated series)
Plecak pełen przygód
Podróż za jeden uśmiech (television series)
Podróże do bajek
Pomysłowy Dobromir
Pomysłowy wnuczek
Porwanie Baltazara Gąbki (animated series)
Powrót do Wiklinowej Zatoki
Proszę słonia
Przygody Błękitnego Rycerzyka
Przygody Misia Colargola
Przygody Myszki
Przygody psa Cywila
Przygody skrzatów
Przygrywka (miniserial)
Przygód kilka wróbla Ćwirka
Przypadki Zwierzo-Jeża
Reksio
Rozalka Olaboga (miniserial)
Samochodzik i templariusze
Siedem stron świata
Siedem życzeń
Stawiam na Tolka Banana (television series)
Szaleństwa panny Ewy (television series)
Szaleństwo Majki Skowron (television series)
Szatan z siódmej klasy (television series)
Słoneczna włócznia
Tajemnica Sagali
Tajemnica szyfru Marabuta
Tajemnice wiklinowej zatoki
Tajna misja (television series)
Trzy szalone zera
Tydzień przygód w Afryce
Tylko Kaśka
Ucieczka-wycieczka
Urwisy z Doliny Młynów
W krainie czarnoksiężnika Oza (animated series)
W krainie Władcy Smoków
W piątą stronę świata
Wakacje z duchami (television series)
WOW (television series)
Wyprawa Profesora Gąbki
Wędrówki Pyzy
Z przygodą na ty
Zaczarowany ołówek
Zima w Wiklinowej Zatoce
Znak orła
Zwierzaki-cudaki
Żegnaj Rockefeller

Comedy

39 i pół
Agentki
Ale się kręci
Anioł Stróż (television series)
Badziewiakowie
Bank nie z tej ziemi
Bao-Bab, czyli zielono mi
Bar Atlantic
Barbara i Jan
BrzydUla
Bulionerzy
Camera Café
Całkiem nowe lata miodowe
Codzienna 2 m. 3
Czego się boją faceci, czyli seks w mniejszym mieście
Czterdziestolatek
Czterdziestolatek. 20 lat później
Cztery poziomo
Daleko od noszy
Do wesela się zagoi
Duch w dom
Duża przerwa
Dziki (television series)
Dziki 2: Pojedynek
Dziupla Cezara
Faceci do wzięcia
Fitness Club
Garderoba damska
Generał Italia
Gosia i Małgosia
Graczykowie
Graczykowie, czyli Buła i spóła
Grzeszni i bogaci
Halo Hans!
Hela w opałach
I kto tu rządzi?
Ja, Malinowski
Kaliber 200 volt
Kapitan Bomba
Kasia i Tomek
Klatka B
Kocham Klarę
Kosmici (television series)
Król przedmieścia
Licencja na wychowanie
Lokatorzy
Lot 001
Mamuśki
Małopole czyli świat
Miodowe lata
Myszka Walewska
Na kłopoty... Bednarski
Niania (television series)
Niezły kanał
Okazja
Palce lizać
Panienki
Pod gradobiciem pytań
Pokój 107
Pokój na czarno
Pucuś
Ranczo (television series)
Reggae Rabbits
Rodziców nie ma w domu
Rodzina zastępcza (television series)
Rodzinka (television series)
Rodzinka.pl
Sex FM
Siedem stron świata
Siedem życzeń
Skarb sekretarza
Spadkobiercy
Stacja (television series)
Stacyjka
Sublokatorzy
Synowie
Szpital na perypetiach
Sąsiedzi (television series)
Talki z resztą
Tata, a Marcin powiedział
Trzy po trzy - Numery z kwatery
Tygrysy Europy
Tygrysy Europy 2
U fryzjera
Wiedźmy
Wojna domowa (television series)
Z pianką czy bez
Zakręcone
Zmiennicy
Świat według Kiepskich
Święta wojna

Crime

07 zgłoś się
Akwarium, czyli Samotność szpiega
Akwen Eldorado
Barbara i Jan
Czas honoru (television series)
Czwarta władza (television series)
Defekt
Ekstradycja (television series)
Fala zbrodni
Fałszerze - powrót Sfory
Gorący Temat
Królowie śródmieścia
Misja (television series)
N1ckola
Naznaczony
Odwróceni
Oficer (television series)
Oficerowie
Pakt
Pitbull (television series)
Podziemny front
Pogranicze w ogniu
Powrót doktora von Kniprode
Prawo miasta
Przygody psa Cywila
The Mire (television series) (2018) (Rojst) set in 1980's SW Poland.
S.O.S. (television series)
Sfora
Tajemnica twierdzy szyfrów
The Woods (miniseries) (W głębi lasu) 2020 Netflix mystery thriller
Trzeci oficer
Trzecia granica
Twarzą w twarz (television series)
Zaginiona
Zbrodnia (2014) (The Crime) TV series set in the town of Hel, Poland
Życie na gorąco (television series)

Documentary

Alfabet mafii
Aniołki (television series)
Apetyt na Europę
Babilon.pl
Errata do biografii
Historia Naturalna Polski
N1ckola
Polska Jasienicy
Tańcząca z Gruzją

Drama 

Aby do świtu...
Adam i Ewa (television series)
Akwarium, czyli Samotność szpiega
Alternatywy 4
Apetyt na miłość
Apetyt na życie
Ballada o Januszku
Banda Rudego Pająka
Bao-Bab, czyli zielono mi
Barwy szczęścia
Bez tajemnic (television series)
Biała wizytówka
Białe tango
Blisko, coraz bliżej
Blondynka
Boża podszewka (television series)
Boża podszewka II
BrzydUla
Bulionerzy
Będziesz moja
Chichot losu (television series)
Chłopi (television series)
Czterdziestolatek
Czterdziestolatek. 20 lat później
Czułość i kłamstwa
Daleko od szosy
Dekalog
Doktor Ewa
Doktor Murek
Dom (television series)
Dom nad rozlewiskiem (television series)
Dom niespokojnej starości (television series)
Dorastanie (television series)
Doręczyciel
Droga (television series)
Dwie strony medalu
Dyrektorzy
Egzamin z życia
Fitness Club
Gruby
Głęboka woda
Hotel 52
Hotel pod żyrafą i nosorożcem
Ile jest życia
Ja wam pokażę! (television series)
Jan Serce
Janka (television series)
Jest jak jest
Kariera Nikodema Dyzmy (television series)
Karino
Klan (television series)
Klinika samotnych serc
Klub profesora Tutki
Klub szalonych dziewic
Kochaj mnie, kochaj!
Komediantka (television series)
Kopciuszek (television series)
Królowie śródmieścia
Lalka (television series)
Lato leśnych ludzi (television series)
Licencja na wychowanie
Linia życia (television series)
Londyńczycy (television series)
M jak miłość
Magda M.
Majka
Marzenia do spełnienia
Matki, żony i kochanki
Miasteczko (television series)
Miłość nad rozlewiskiem (television series)
My Baby
Na dobre i na złe
Na kocią łapę
Na Wspólnej
Nad Niemnem (television series)
Najważniejszy dzień życia
Noce i dnie (television series)
Ojciec Mateusz
Palce lizać
Panny i Wdowy
Pensjonat pod Różą
Pierwsza miłość
Plebania (television series)
Pogoda na piątek
Polskie drogi (television series)
Popielec (television series)
Prosto w serce (television series)
Przedwiośnie (television series)
Przepis na życie (television series)
Przeprowadzki
Przystań (television series)
Psie serce (television series)
Radio Romans
Rajskie klimaty
Regina (television series)
Rodzina Kanderów
Rodzina Leśniewskich
Rodzina Połanieckich (television series)
Rzeka kłamstwa
Ród Gąsieniców (television series)
Samo Życie
Siedlisko (television series)
Siostry (television series)
Sprawa na dziś
Spółka rodzinna
Stacyjka
Stawiam na Tolka Banana (television series)
Strachy (television series)
Szpilki na Giewoncie
Sława i chwała (television series)
Tak czy nie?
Talki z resztą
Tancerze
Lista odcinków serialu Tancerze
Tango z aniołem
Teraz albo nigdy!
Trędowata (television series)
Twarze i maski
Twarzą w twarz (television series)
Tylko miłość
Układ krążenia (television series)
Urwisy z Doliny Młynów
Usta usta
W labiryncie (television series)
W piątą stronę świata
W słońcu i w deszczu
Warto kochać
Wiedźmy
Więzy krwi (television series 2001)
Wojna domowa (television series)
Z biegiem lat, z biegiem dni...
Zaginiona
Zespół adwokacki (television series)
Znaki szczególne (television series)
Zostać miss
Zostać miss 2
Złotopolscy
Ślad na ziemi
Życie jak poker
Życie Kamila Kuranta

Fantasy

Alchemik Sendivius
Dwa światy (television series)
Magiczne drzewo
Maszyna zmian
Maszyna zmian. Nowe przygody
Mistrz i Małgorzata (television series 1988)
Pierścień i róża (television series)
Siedem życzeń
Stara baśń (television series)
Słoneczna włócznia
Tajemnica Sagali
Wiedźmin (television series)
WOW (television series)

History

1920. Wojna i miłość
Archiwista (television series)
Biała wizytówka
Blisko, coraz bliżej
Chłopi (television series)
Crimen (television series)
Czarne chmury
Czas honoru (television series)
Gazda z Diabelnej (television series)
Gdańsk 39
Generał (television series)
Gniewko, syn rybaka
Hrabina Cosel (television series)
Kanclerz (television series)
Komediantka (television series)
Kopernik (television series)
Królewskie sny
Królowa Bona
Kuchnia Polska (television series)
Lalka (television series)
Marszałek Piłsudski
Modrzejewska
Nad Niemnem (television series)
Najdłuższa wojna nowoczesnej Europy
Noce i dnie (television series)
Ogniem i mieczem (television series)
Oko proroka czyli Hanusz Bystry i jego przygody (television series)
Polska Jasienicy
Przedwiośnie (television series)
Przygody pana Michała
Przyłbice i kaptury
Quo vadis (television series)
Rodzina Połanieckich (television series)
Rycerze i rabusie
Rzeka kłamstwa
Ród Gąsieniców (television series)
Stara baśń (television series)
Syzyfowe prace (television series)
Sława i chwała (television series)
Tajemnica twierdzy szyfrów
W pustyni i w puszczy (television series 1974)
W pustyni i w puszczy (television series 2001)
Wielka miłość Balzaka
Wojna i pokój (television series 2007)
Z biegiem lat, z biegiem dni...
Zaklęty dwór (television series)
Ziemia obiecana (television series)
Znak orła

Military

1920. Wojna i miłość
1944 (film)
Biała wizytówka
Czas honoru (television series)
Czterej pancerni i pies
Do krwi ostatniej
Kolumbowie (television series)
Podziemny front
Pogranicze w ogniu
Polskie drogi (television series)
Popielec (television series)
Powrót doktora von Kniprode
Sprawiedliwi (television series)
Stawka wieksza niz zycie
Tajemnica Enigmy
Tajemnica twierdzy szyfrów
Trzecia granica
Wojenna narzeczona
Wojna i pokój (television series 2007)

Period

Alchemik Sendivius
Awantura o Basię (television series)
Chłopi (television series)
Crimen (television series)
Czarne chmury
Gniewko, syn rybaka
Hrabina Cosel (television series)
Janosik (television series)
Kanclerz (television series)
Komediantka (television series)
Kopernik (television series)
Królewskie sny
Królowa Bona
Lalka (television series)
Modrzejewska
Na kłopoty... Bednarski
Nad Niemnem (television series)
Noce i dnie (television series)
Ogniem i mieczem (television series)
Oko proroka czyli Hanusz Bystry i jego przygody (television series)
Pierścień i róża (television series)
Przedwiośnie (television series)
Przygody pana Michała
Przyłbice i kaptury
Quo vadis (television series)
Rodzina Połanieckich (television series)
Rycerze i rabusie
Ród Gąsieniców (television series)
Stara baśń (television series)
Strachy (television series)
Syzyfowe prace (television series)
Szaleństwa panny Ewy (television series)
Szatan z siódmej klasy (television series)
Sława i chwała (television series)
Temida (television series)
Trędowata (television series)
W pustyni i w puszczy (television series 1974)
W pustyni i w puszczy (television series 2001)
Wielka miłość Balzaka
Wojna i pokój (television series 2007)
Z biegiem lat, z biegiem dni...
Zaklęty dwór (television series)
Ziemia obiecana (television series)
Znak orła
Święty Augustyn (miniserial)

External links
 Poland TV at the Internet Movie Database

 

Television series